Biddy Jenkinson (a pseudonym) is an Irish poet, short story writer and dramatist who writes in the Irish language. She was born in 1949 in Dublin  and attended University College Cork.  She has published several collections of verse, two collections of short stories and two plays.

It has been said of Jenkinson that she seeks to recreate a sense of the sacral world of nature and women’s role in sustaining it. She has a deep interest in literary tradition. Her chosen creative language is Irish and she has expressed her opposition to ‘the insistence that everything written in Irish be translated immediately into English’. Her work has been praised for its passion, humour and variety.

She was editor of Éigse Éireann/Poetry Ireland Review from 2000 to 2001.

Published work

Poetry
Sceilg na Scál (Coiscéim 2017)

TáinRith (Coiscéim 2013)

Oíche Bhealtaine (Coiscéim 2005)

Mis (Coiscéim 2001)

Rogha dánta (anthology) ed. Siobhán Ní Fhoghlú and Seán Ó Tuama (Cork University Press 1999)

Amhras Neimhe (Coiscéim 1997)

Dán na hUidhre (Coiscéim 1991)

Uiscí Beatha (Coiscéim 1988)

Baisteadh Gintlí (Coiscéim 1986)

Short Stories
Duinnín - Bleachtaire - Ar An Sceilg (Coiscéim 2011)

An tAthair Pádraig Ó Duinnín - Bleachtaire (Coiscéim 2008)

An Grá Riabhach - Gáirscéalta  (Coiscéim 2000)

Plays
Mise, Subhó agus Maccó (Cló Iar-Chonnacht 2000)

Oh, Rahjerum! (Coiscéim 1998)

Books for Children
An Bhanríon Bess agus Gusaí Gaimbín (Coiscéim 2007), in association with Ribó

Mo Scéal Féin xx Púca (Coiscéim 2004), illustrated by Ribó

Notes

1949 births
Living people
Irish-language writers
Irish women dramatists and playwrights
Irish women poets
Irish women short story writers
20th-century Irish short story writers
20th-century Irish dramatists and playwrights
20th-century Irish poets
20th-century Irish women writers
21st-century Irish short story writers
21st-century Irish dramatists and playwrights
21st-century Irish poets
21st-century Irish women writers